The Florida Atlantic Owls football program represents Florida Atlantic University (FAU) in the sport of American football. The Owls compete in the Football Bowl Subdivision (FBS) of the National Collegiate Athletic Association (NCAA) and the American Athletic Conference. The Owls' head coach from 2019 to 2022 was Willie Taggart. Florida Atlantic has produced a Sun Belt Conference co-championship team in 2007, two Conference USA championships in 2017 and 2019, along with 4 postseason bowl appearances and one appearance in the 2003 I-AA Playoffs. The Owls play their home games at FAU Stadium which has a seating capacity of 29,419.

History

Howard Schnellenberger era (2001–2011)
Florida Atlantic University football began play in 2001 with legendary coach Howard Schnellenberger serving as head coach until 2011. Schnellenberger was a former offensive coordinator with the NFLs Indianapolis Colts and Miami Dolphins who, as a head coach, turned around a moribund Miami football program and won a national championship in his fifth season in 1983 after back to back nine win seasons in 1980 and 1981. Schnellenberger also turned around a downtrodden Louisville football program, winning the Fiesta Bowl in 1990.

After competing their first four years as an NCAA Division I-AA independent, the Owls moved to Division I-A and the Sun Belt Conference. Starting with the 2013–14 school year, FAU athletics have competed in Conference USA.

In 1998, Florida Atlantic University announced it was pursuing the creation of an NCAA football program and that Howard Schnellenberger was going to lead the charge, as director of football operations and head coach. After his success in rebuilding programs at Miami and Louisville, Coach Schnellenberger now undertook the role of building a program from scratch. Much like his time at Miami and Louisville, Coach Schnellenberger did not shy from placing lofty expectations and high goals on his newly created program. Even before FAU would play an intercollegiate game, Coach Schnellenberger explained the goal of FAU football would be to play the best teams it can schedule, in order for the program to aim for a national championship in Division I-A football. These extreme goals were not unusual from a man like Coach Schnellenberger.  At Louisville, facing threats from the administration that the football team would be terminated, Schnellenberger made the bold (and now famous) prediction, "[We are] on a collision course with the national championship.  The only variable is time.”

On August 29, 2000, the first practice was held at the Boca Raton campus of FAU, and 164 students showed up to try out for the team.  During the August 29, 2000, first practice, dubbed the inaugural scrimmage game, FAU continued the tradition of Homecoming King, this time including the crowning ceremony of the King as part of the halftime festivities.  The Homecoming King crown was bestowed upon Wayne Burns, having been voted in by the majority of student population from across all the campuses at the time, which totaled five, then running a Q&A gauntlet alongside the top three candidates, conducted by a committee of students and faculty, who then voted to determine if Mr. Burns would move to the winners circle or if the next candidate would get the crown.  Mr. Burns was driven around the scrimmage game field in a convertible Rolls-Royce to wave to the 164 students in the stands, many of whom voted for him.  Wayne Burns was and is the oldest Homecoming King to ever receive the honor at FAU. Florida Atlantic joined NCAA Division I-AA, now known as Division I FCS, as an independent team for the 2001 season.  Its first-ever intercollegiate competition was against Slippery Rock University, which the Owls lost 40–7 in front of 25,632 fans at Joe Robbie Stadium, now known as Hard Rock Stadium.

The team finished its inaugural season at 4–6 and followed the next season at 2–9.  Major accomplishments in its first two seasons include the program's first win, which came in its second game, against Bethune–Cookman, 31–28, and won in the first meeting with newly created South Florida rival, Florida International University, 31–21.

On September 15, 2007, FAU defeated its first Big Ten opponent with a 42–39 victory over Minnesota. Led by Rusty Smith, FAU beat Troy in the final game of the 2007 season to become Sun Belt Conference champions and received an invitation to the 2007 New Orleans Bowl, its first ever bowl bid. As a result, in just the seventh year of the football program's history, and the third year playing in Division I, Florida Atlantic set an NCAA mark by becoming the second-youngest program ever to receive an invitation to a bowl game.  They were surpassed only by the undefeated 1958 Air Force Falcons, who had played just one year of Division 1 football before being invited to the Cotton Bowl, where they played to a scoreless tie against the TCU Horned Frogs on January 1, 1959.

On August 11, 2011, Howard Schnellenberger announced he would retire at the end of the season. The Owls ended the 2011 season 1–11, with the only victory coming from a 38–35 home win over UAB.

Carl Pelini era (2012–2013)
On December 1, 2011, FAU hired Carl Pelini, the Nebraska Cornhuskers defensive coordinator to become their new head coach, to succeed Schnellenberger.

On October 30, 2013, Pelini resigned from his position after another coach alleged to school officials that he was using illegal drugs, charges that Pelini denied. He, along with defensive coordinator Pete Rekstis, officially stepped down from their positions only three days before the school's homecoming game, which they won 34–17 under interim head coach Brian Wright. Under Pelini, the Owls compiled a 5–14 record.

Wright finished the 2012–13 season as the interim head coach, winning the team's last four games and led the Owls to its first bowl-eligible season since 2008–09. The Owls finished 6–6 for the season but were not invited to a bowl game.

Charlie Partridge era (2014–2016)
On December 16, 2013, FAU announced it had hired Charlie Partridge as head coach. Prior to accepting the job at FAU, Partridge was the defensive line coach at Arkansas. On November 27, 2016, FAU fired Partridge after 3 consecutive 3–9 seasons.

Lane Kiffin era (2017–2019)
On December 12, 2016, it was announced that former USC and Tennessee head coach Lane Kiffin would become the Owls' next head coach. Kiffin resigned from FAU on December 7, 2019, after a 49–6 blowout win against the university of Alabama at Birmingham (UAB) and before FAU's Boca Raton Bowl appearance against SMU Mustangs to become the head coach at the University of Mississippi (Ole Miss). Kiffin left FAU with a record of 26–13 with two first-place finishes in Conference USA. In December 2019, FAU tight end Harrison Bryant won the John Mackey Award, becoming the first FAU player to win a major collegiate postseaon award, as well as becoming FAU's first consensus, and later unanimous, All-American. FAU's first year defensive coordinator, Glenn Spencer, was named the interim head coach to lead the Owls at the Boca Raton Bowl.

Willie Taggart era (2020–2022) 

On December 11, 2019, FAU announced the hiring of Willie Taggart as the next head coach. During a shortened season due to the COVID-19 pandemic with no prior spring practice, Taggart led the FAU Owls to a 5–4 record, which includes a loss to the Memphis Tigers in the first and only Montgomery Bowl. He was fired on November 26, 2022, finishing with a 15–18 record. Defensive coordinator Todd Orlando served as interim head coach during the transition period to find a new head coach.

Tom Herman era (2023-present) 
On December 1, 2022, FAU announced the hiring of former Houston and Texas head coach Tom Herman as the next head coach.

Conference affiliations
 Independent (NCAA Division I-AA) (2001–2003)
 Independent (NCAA Division I-A) (2004)
 Sun Belt Conference (2005–2012) 
 Conference USA (2013–2022)
 American Athletic Conference (2023–future)

Championships

Conference championships 
Florida Atlantic has won three conference championships, two outright and one shared.

† Co-champions
‡ 2019 Boca Raton Bowl win coached by Glenn Spencer

Division championships
As a member of Conference USA since 2013, Florida Atlantic competes in the East Division. The Owls have won two division titles.

Bowl games
Florida Atlantic has played in 5 bowl games, compiling a record of 4–1.

Head coaches

Rivalries

Florida International

The Shula Bowl is the rivalry game with Florida International. It was first played in 2002 and has been played every year since then. The winner receives the Don Shula Award.  The game and trophy are named after former Miami Dolphins head coach Don Shula. The game is typically either in Boca Raton or Miami, though there have been meetings in other locations in the Miami metropolitan area.

In total the two squads have met 17 times with Florida Atlantic holding a 13–4 lead as of the 2019 season conclusion.  The 2005 game does not count with FIU having to vacate their victory due to NCAA violations and penalties.

Notable alumni and personnel

Current NFL players

Former NFL Players

Future Non-Conference Opponents
Announced schedules as of September 26, 2022.

Individual national award winners

Consensus/Unanimous All-Americans
10 Florida Atlantic players have been awarded as All-Americans, with one Florida Atlantic player being awarded as a consensus All-American, later becoming a unanimous All-American.

References

External links

 

 
American football teams established in 2001
2001 establishments in Florida